Titanides may refer to:

 The sisters of the six Titan (mythology) (a race of powerful deities in Greek mythology) and many of their sons and daughters.
Titanide (Gaea trilogy) a fictional race of alien centaurs in John Varley's Gaea Trilogy